Mars Kadiombo Yamba Bilonda (3 March 1958 – 15 July 2021) was a Congolese actor, screenwriter, and film director. He was also a stage actor and director.

Filmography
La face cachée de Mobutu (2016)
Coloré (2019)
Paris à tout prix (2021)

References

1958 births
2021 deaths
Democratic Republic of the Congo male actors
Democratic Republic of the Congo screenwriters
Democratic Republic of the Congo film directors
People from Katanga Province
21st-century Democratic Republic of the Congo people